Clivipollia pulchra is a species of sea snail, a marine gastropod mollusc in the family Prodotiidae

Description

Distribution
This species occurs in the Red Sea.

References

 Vine, P. (1986). Red Sea Invertebrates. Immel Publishing, London. 224 pp.

Prodotiidae
Gastropods described in 1846